Íslendingadrápa (The drápa of the Icelanders) is a skaldic poem composed in Iceland in the 12th or 13th century. It is preserved only in AM 748 Ib 4to, one of the manuscripts of the Prose Edda. The manuscript identifies the author as one Haukr Valdísarson, a man otherwise unknown. The poem consists of 26 dróttkvætt stanzas and the first two lines of the 27th. At that point, the preserved part of the manuscript terminates and the end of the poem is lost.

The poem relates the deeds of a number of Icelandic heroes and skalds from the 10th and 11th centuries,  including Egill Skallagrímsson, Grettir Ásmundarson, Kormákr Ögmundarson and Hallfreðr vandræðaskáld. Carol J. Clover has called the poem "a kind of native de viris illustribus and de casibus virorum illustrium combined".

Notes

References

 Clover, Carol J. and John Lindow (2005). Old Norse-Icelandic Literature : A Critical Guide. University of Toronto Press. 
 Guðrún Nordal (2001). Tools of Literacy : The Role of Skaldic Verse in Icelandic Textual Culture of the Twelfth and Thirteenth Centuries. University of Toronto Press. 
 Eysteinn Björnsson (2002). Index of Old Norse/Icelandic Skaldic Poetry. Published online at: http://www.hi.is/~eybjorn/ugm/skindex/skindex.html See in particular Íslendingadrápa at http://www.hi.is/~eybjorn/ugm/skindex/isl.html from the editions of Finnur Jónsson and E. A. Kock.

Skaldic poems